Viktor Skála is a Czech stage and television actor. He was born on 3 March 1968, Brno, Czechoslovakia. He is a member of the Brno City Theatre.

Theatre

City Theatre 
Master and Margarita .... master
Manon Lescaut .... Tiberge
Smrt obchodního cestujícího .... Bernard
Peer Gynt .... Peer Gynt
Nevyléčitelní .... Bruce
The Picture of Dorian Gray .... Alan Campbell
Bez roucha .... Garry Lejeune
Romeo and Jana .... Lucien
Slaměný klobouk .... Beauerthuis
V jámě lvové .... Mr. Strassky
Marketa Lazarová .... Mr. Lazar
Fiddler on the Roof .... officer
Death of Paul I .... Tatarinov/Prince/Colonel
The Diary of King .... Cyril Abid/Narrator
Equus .... Martin Dysart
Patrik Kumšt .... Boris/Viktor
The Three Musketeers .... Daddy/King/Executioner
Twelfth Night .... Malvolio
Síla zvyku .... Juggler
Cyrano de Bergerac .... De Guiche
Love's Labour's Lost .... Kotrba
Mourning Becomes Electra .... Adam Brant
One Flew Over the Cuckoo's Nest .... Dale Harding
Cabaret .... Ernst Ludwig
Kamenný most aneb Prostopášník .... Arlecchino
Henry VIII .... First Man
Máj .... Poet
Arcadia .... Septimus Hodge
Znamení kříže .... Gil, village guy
Ginger and Fred .... Author
Amfitryon .... Mercur
The Importance of Being Earnest .... John Worthing
Hair .... Psychologist/Officer
Odysseia .... Hades
Not Now, Darling .... Arnold Crouch
Red and Black .... François-Marie Arouet Voltaire
The Magic Flute .... Spokesman

Filmography 
Velkofilm (2007)
Já z toho budu mít smrt (2005)
Krev zmizelého (2003)
Elektrický nůž (1999)
"Četnické humoresky" (1997) TV series
Případ s černým vzadu (1992)
Svlékání kůže (1991)
Král lenochů (1989)
Třetí sudička (1986)

External links 
City Theatre Website
ČSFD.cz

Czech male stage actors
Czech male television actors
Living people
1968 births